Basem Al-Montashari (born 18 September 1990) is a Saudi Arabian footballer who played as a defender for Al-Ittihad in the  Saudi Professional League.

References

External links
 

Living people
1990 births
Saudi Arabian footballers
Association football defenders
Ittihad FC players
Sportspeople from Jeddah
Saudi Professional League players